Knowle Football Club is a football club based in Knowle Solihull, in the West Midlands, England.

History
The club was established in 1926 as Knowle Men's Institute. They played in the Birmingham Youth & Old Boys League, winning the league and league cup double in 1946–47. In 1966 the club, now known as Knowle Football Club, joined Division Two of the Worcestershire Combination, which was renamed the Midland Combination in 1968. Although they finished as Division Two runners-up in 1968–69, they were not promoted. However, following a fifth-place finish the following season, the club moved up to Division One.

In 1982–83 Knowle finished bottom of Division One, but avoided being relegated to Division Two. The club adopted the name Knowle North Star prior to the start of the 1983–84 season, which saw them finish bottom of the renamed Premier Division again. They also finished bottom of the division the following season. In 1985 the club reverted to their previous name. In 1996–97 they won the league's Challenge Cup, beating Kings Heath 5–4 on penalties after the final had ended 3–3. The club remained in the Premier Division until the end of the 1997–98 season, when they were demoted to Division One due to a lack of floodlights.

The 1998–99 season saw Knowle finish as runners-up in Division One. They went on to win the division in 2002–03 and 2005–06, but were unable to take promotion due to the lack of floodlights at their ground. In 2007–08 the club won the league's Presidents Cup and the Division One title, and were promoted to the Premier Division after agreeing a groundshare with Studley. However, they were demoted again at the end of the 2009–10 season despite finishing eleventh in the Premier Division, returning to their home ground in Knowle.

Knowle were Division One runners-up in 2010–11 and won the Challenge Cup again in 2013–14. At the end of the season the Midland Combination merged with the Midland Alliance to form the Midland League, with Knowle placed in Division Two.

Ground
The club play at the Robin's Nest ground on Hampton Road. A clubhouse was built on one side of the pitch shortly after World War II. An overhang from the building's roof provided cover to two rows of seating and a small covered standing area was provided on the same side of the pitch. However these were destroyed in 2017 during Storm Doris, leaving the club with no clubhouse or covered seating. In October 2018 a temporary modular unit building was installed on site to serve as a clubhouse.

Honours
Midland Combination
Division One champions 2002–03, 2005–06, 2007–08
Presidents Cup winners 2007–08, 2013–14
Challenge Cup winners 1996–97
Birmingham Youth & Old Boys League
Champions 1946–47
League Cup winners 1946–47

Records
Best FA Vase performance: Fifth round, 1981–82

See also
Knowle F.C. players
Knowle F.C. managers

References

External links
Official website

 
Football clubs in England
Football clubs in the West Midlands (county)
Association football clubs established in 1926
1926 establishments in England
Solihull
Midland Football Combination
Midland Football League